Saif Ali Zaib (born 22 May 1998) is an English cricketer who plays for Northamptonshire County Cricket Club. A spin-bowling all-rounder, Zaib is a left-handed batsman, who bowls left-arm orthodox spin. He made his List A debut for the county against the touring New Zealand A cricket team in July 2014, and his first-class debut the following August.

Ahead of the 2015 season, Zaib signed a three-year contract with Northamptonshire.

He made his Twenty20 cricket debut for Northamptonshire in the 2017 NatWest t20 Blast on 27 July 2017.

References

External links
 
 

1998 births
Living people
Sportspeople from High Wycombe
People educated at the Royal Grammar School, High Wycombe
English cricketers
Northamptonshire cricketers
Buckinghamshire cricketers